is a Japanese actor and voice actor affiliated with the Seinenza Theater Company. He has been married to Romi Park since 2020.

Filmography

Live-action films
 2000: Whiteout (Takayoshi Yoshikane)
 2001: Inugami (Takanao)
 2004: Kamen Rider Blade: Missing Ace (Kei Karasuma)
 2004: Premonition (Dr. Mitamura)
 2010: Made in Japan: Kora! (Kanji)
 2012: Bayside Shakedown: The Final (Fukuda)
 2015: The Emperor in August (Tōji Yasui)
 2015: Kakekomi (Keisai Eisen)
 2017: Teiichi: Battle of Supreme High (Usaburō Tōgō)
 2018: Laughing Under the Clouds
 2021: Baragaki: Unbroken Samurai (Hikogorō Satō)
 2021 Janitor (Majima)

Television dramas
 1978: Taiyō ni Hoero!
 1997: Gift
 1997: Under One Roof (Sigeru Terada)
 1998: Nemureru Mori
 2004: Kamen Rider Blade (Kei Karasuma (eps. 1 - 8, 15, 16, 25, 49))
 2007: Kamen Rider Den-O (Leo Imagin (ep. 37 - 38))
 2014: Gunshi Kanbei (Ankokuji Ekei)
 2016: Naomi and Kanako
 2017: I'm Sorry, I Love You  (Tatsuomi Kurokawa)
 2019: Idaten (Ryōhei Murayama)
 2020: Awaiting Kirin (Miyoshi Nagayoshi)
 2020: Cold Case Season 3
 2020-2021: Mashin Sentai Kiramager (Emperor Yodon)
 2022: Chimudondon (Zen'ichi Maeda)
 2022: Elpis (The deputy prime minister Yūji Daimon)

Stage
 1981–1982 The Threepenny Opera 
 1990 Yotsuya Kaidan (oiwa, osode)
 1991 Carmen (Don José)
 1995 The Lady of the Camellias
 2000 Phoenix (Fujiwara no Nakamaro)
 2006 Marie Antoinette (Beaumarchais)
 2006–2013 Anna Karenina (Karenin)
 2007–2010 Takarazuka Boys (Kazuya Ikeda)
 2012: Hamlet (Polonius)
 2017 Edo Kaikitan: Mukasari (The storyteller) 
 2018: Mary Poppins (George Banks)
 2018: Of Mice and Men (Candy)
 2019: Crime and Punishment (Svidrigaïlov)
 2021 Musical GOYA

Anime series
 1996: Detective Conan (Yukio Ayashiro)
 1997: Detective Conan (Noboru Taniguchi)
 1998: Rurouni Kenshin (First Lieutenant Meldars)
 2001: Geneshaft (Larry)
 2001: Sadamitsu the Destroyer (Ponkotsu / Junk)
 2001: Gensomaden Saiyuki (Gojun)
 2002: Detective Conan (Kyōgo Kitaura)
 2003: Last Exile (Ressius)
 2005: Onegai My Melody (Grandfather)
 2005: Monster (Rheinhart Dinger)
 2006: Mushishi (Amane's Father)
 2012: Psycho-Pass (Jōji Saiga)
 2012: Sword Art Online (Shozo Yuuki)
 2013: DokiDoki! PreCure (Bel)
 2014: One Piece (Señor Pink)
 2014: Psycho-Pass 2 (Jōji Saiga)
 2014: Space Dandy (Meow's Father)
 2014: Yu-Gi-Oh! Arc-V (Narrator)
 2014: Garo: Honō no Kokuin (León's Grandfather)
 2015: One-Punch Man (Silver Fang)
 2015: Senki Zesshou Symphogear GX (Yatsuhiro Kazanari (ep. 6, 13))
 2016: Dragon Ball Super (Hit)
 2016: 91 Days (Vincent)
 2016: One Piece (Gildo Tesoro)
 2017: Blue Exorcist: Kyoto Saga (Saburota Todo)
 2017: Gintama. (Uranus Hankai)
 2017: Granblue Fantasy The Animation (Eugen (Game Voiced by Keiji Fujiwara) (eps. 9 - 10, 12))
 2017: Senki Zesshou Symphogear AXZ (Yatsuhiro Kazanari (ep. 6, 13))
 2017: Altair: A Record of Battles (Silvestro Brega)
 2017: Kamiwaza Wanda (Great)
 2018: Kokkoku: Moment by Moment (Old Man)
 2018: Attack On Titan Season 3 (Captain Kenny Ackerman)
 2019: One-Punch Man 2 (Silver Fang)
 2019: Senki Zesshou Symphogear XV (Yatsuhiro Kazanari)
 2020: Wave, Listen to Me! (Katsumi Kureko)
 2020: The God of High School (Jin Taejin)
 2021: Dragon Quest: The Adventure of Dai (Matoriv)
 2021: Farewell, My Dear Cramer (Kenroku Washizu)
 2021: How Not to Summon a Demon Lord Ω (Batutta)
 2021: Megaton Musashi (Genta Ibushi)
 2022: Spy × Family (Henry Henderson)
 2022: Lucifer and the Biscuit Hammer (Inachika Akitani)
 2023: High Card (Bernard Symons)
 2023: Dead Mount Death Play (Rozan Shinoyama)

Original video animation
 1995: Black Jack (Dr. Kiriko)
 1998: Tekken: The Motion Picture (Kazuya Mishima)
 2000: Master Keaton (James Kelling)
 2005: Final Fantasy VII Advent Children (Cid Highwind)

Original net animation
 2021: Record of Ragnarok (Kojirō Sasaki)
 2023: Make My Day (Walter)

Anime films
 1995: Ghost in the Shell (Cleaning staff)
 1997: Detective Conan: The Time-Bombed Skyscraper (Daisuke Kurokawa)
 2002: Crayon Shin-chan: The Storm Called: The Battle of the Warring States (Okurai Takatora)
 2004: Saint Seiya (Apollon)
 2015: The Boy and the Beast (Iōzen)
 2015: Psycho-Pass: The Movie (Jōji Saiga)
 2016: One Piece Film: Gold (Gildo Tesoro)
 2016: Yu-Gi-Oh!: The Dark Side of Dimensions (Ryō Bakura's Father)
 2017: The Night Is Short, Walk on Girl (Tōdō-san)
 2017: Blame! (Oyassan)
 2017: Detective Conan: Crimson Love Letter (Heizo Hattori)
 2017: Godzilla: Planet of the Monsters (Endurphe)
 2018: Mobile Suit Gundam Narrative (Abaev)
 2021: Sword Art Online Progressive: Aria of a Starless Night (Shozo Yuuki)

Video games
 1999: Crash Team Racing (Japanese dub) - Pinstripe Potoroo
 2001: Mobile Suit Gundam: Zeonic Front - Lou Roher
 2003: Spider-Man (Japanese dub) - Norman Osborn/Green Goblin
 2003: Glass Rose - Ryouji Ihara
 2005: Kingdom Hearts II - Cid Highwind
 2005: Rogue Galaxy - Zegram Ghart
 2005: Yakuza - Makoto Date
 2006: Dirge of Cerberus: Final Fantasy VII - Cid Highwind
 2006: Yakuza 2 - Makoto Date
 2009: Yakuza 3 - Makoto Date
 2010: Yakuza 4 - Makoto Date
 2011: Yakuza: Dead Souls - Makoto Date
 2012: Yakuza 5 - Makoto Date
 2013: Beyond: Two Souls (Japanese dub) - Nathan Dawkins
 2013: Call of Duty: Ghosts (Japanese dub) - Gabriel Rorke
 2014: Ryū ga Gotoku Ishin! - Nakaoka Shintarō
 2015: Lego Marvel Super Heroes (Japanese dub) - Wolverine
 2015: The Witcher 3: Wild Hunt (Japanese dub) - Geralt of Rivia
 2016: Yakuza Kiwami - Makoto Date
 2016: Yakuza 6 - Makoto Date
 2017: Resident Evil 7: Biohazard (Japanese dub) - Jack Baker
 2017: Fate/Grand Order - Yagyu Tajima-no-Kami Munenori
 2017: Yakuza Kiwami 2 - Makoto Date
 2018: Dragon Ball FighterZ - Hit
 2018: Soulcalibur VI - Geralt of Rivia
 2018: Street Fighter V: Arcade Edition - G
 2019: Jump Force - Prometheus / Director Glover
 2019: Death Stranding (Japanese dub) - Cliff
 2020: Yakuza: Like a Dragon - Makoto Date
 2020: Kingdom Hearts III Re Mind - Cid Highwind
 2020: Nioh 2 - Saitō Dōsan
 2020: War of the Visions Final Fantasy Brave Exvius - Eldo Leonis
 2021: Nier Reincarnation - Argo

Dubbing roles

Live-action
Jason Statham
Lock, Stock and Two Smoking Barrels (Bacon)
Snatch (Turkish)
The Transporter (Frank Martin)
Revolver (Jake Green)
Transporter 2 (Frank Martin)
Crank (Chev Chelios)
The Bank Job (Terry Leather)
Death Race (Jensen Ames)
Transporter 3 (Frank Martin)
Crank: High Voltage (Chev Chelios)
13 (Jasper Bagges)
The Expendables (Lee Christmas)
Blitz (Tom Brant)
Killer Elite (Danny Bryce)
The Mechanic (Arthur Bishop)
The Expendables 2 (Lee Christmas)
Safe (Luke Wright)
Fast & Furious 6 (Deckard Shaw)
Homefront (Phil Broker)
Hummingbird (Joey Jones)
Parker (Parker)
The Expendables 3 (Lee Christmas)
Furious 7 (Deckard Shaw)
Wild Card (Nick Wild)
Spy (Rick Ford)
Mechanic: Resurrection (Arthur Bishop)
The Fate of the Furious (Deckard Shaw)
The Meg (Jonas Taylor)
Hobbs & Shaw (Deckard Shaw)
F9 (Deckard Shaw)
Wrath of Man (Patrick "H" Hill / Mason Hargreaves)
Hugh Jackman
Swordfish (Stanley Jobson)
X2: X-Men United (Logan / Wolverine)
Van Helsing (Gabriel / Van Helsing)
The Fountain (Tomas / Tommy / Tom Creo)
The Prestige (Robert Angier)
X-Men: The Last Stand (Logan / Wolverine)
Australia (Drover)
Deception (Jamie Getz a.k.a. Wyatt Bose)
X-Men Origins: Wolverine (James Howlett / Logan / Wolverine)
Real Steel (Charles 'Charlie' Kenton)
X-Men: First Class (Logan)
Prisoners (2016 BS Japan edition) (Keller Dover)
The Wolverine (Logan / Wolverine)
X-Men: Days of Future Past (Logan / Wolverine)
Night at the Museum: Secret of the Tomb (Hugh Jackman)
Chappie (Vincent Moore)
Me and Earl and the Dying Girl (Hugh Jackman)
Eddie the Eagle (Bronson Peary)
Logan (Logan / Wolverine / James Howlett)
The Greatest Showman (P. T. Barnum)
Deadpool 2 (Logan / Wolverine)
The Front Runner (Gary Hart)
Reminiscence (Nick Bannister)
Russell Crowe
Rough Magic (Alex Ross)
Mystery, Alaska (Sheriff John Biebe)
Gladiator (Maximus Decimus Meridius)
Cinderella Man (James J. Braddock)
3:10 to Yuma (Ben Wade)
American Gangster (Det. Richie Roberts)
State of Play (Cal McAffrey)
The Next Three Days (John Brennan)
Robin Hood (Robin Longstride / Robin Hood)
The Man with the Iron Fists (Jack Knife)
Broken City (Mayor Nicholas Hostetler)
The Water Diviner (Joshua Connor)
Fathers and Daughters (Jake Davis)
The Mummy (Dr. Henry Jekyll)
The Loudest Voice (Roger Ailes)
Sean Penn
U Turn (Bobby Cooper)
The Thin Red Line (1st Sgt. Edward Welsh)
I Am Sam (Sam Dawson)
Mystic River (Jimmy Markum)
The Interpreter (Tobin Keller)
Fair Game (Joseph Wilson)
The Tree of Life (Jack)
Gangster Squad (Mickey Cohen)
The Secret Life of Walter Mitty (Sean O'Connell)
The Gunman (Jim Terrier)
The Professor and the Madman (Dr. William Chester Minor)
Song Kang-ho
Shiri (Lee Jang-gil)
Joint Security Area (Sergeant Oh Kyeong-pil)
Sympathy for Mr. Vengeance (Park Dong-jin)
Memories of Murder (Detective Park Doo-man)
Antarctic Journal (Choi Do-hyung)
The Host (Park Gang-du)
Secret Sunshine (Kim Jong-chan)
Snowpiercer (Namgoong Minsu)
The Throne (King Yeongjo)
Parasite (Kim Ki-taek)
The King's Letters (King Sejong the Great)
Al Pacino
The Godfather (2001 DVD edition) (Michael Corleone)
The Godfather Part II (2001 DVD edition) (Michael Corleone)
Scarface (2004 DVD edition) (Tony Montana)
Righteous Kill (Detective David Fisk/"Rooster"/The "Poetry Boy" Killer)
The Son of No One (Detective Stanford)
Stand Up Guys (Valentine "Val")
Misconduct (Charles Abrams)
The Irishman (James Riddle "Jimmy" Hoffa)
Once Upon a Time in Hollywood (Marvin Schwarz)
Willem Dafoe
Edges of the Lord (Priest)
Spider-Man (Norman Osborn / Green Goblin)
Once Upon a Time in Mexico (Armando Barillo)
XXX: State of the Union (George Deckert)
Cirque du Freak: The Vampire's Assistant (Gavner Purl)
John Wick (Marcus)
Dog Eat Dog (Mad Dog)
The Lighthouse (Thomas Wake)
Spider-Man: No Way Home (Norman Osborn / Green Goblin)
Christoph Waltz
Inglourious Basterds (Col. Hans Landa)
Carnage (Alan Cowan)
Django Unchained (Dr. King Schultz)
The Zero Theorem (Qohen Leth)
Spectre (Ernst Stavro Blofeld)
The Legend of Tarzan (Captain Léon Rom)
Downsizing (Dušan Mirković)
No Time to Die (Ernst Stavro Blofeld)
Vincent Cassel
The Crimson Rivers (Max Kerkerian)
Irréversible (Marcus)
Secret Agents (Brisseau)
Beauty and the Beast (La Bête (The Beast)/Le Prince (The Prince))
Tale of Tales (King of Strongcliff)
Jason Bourne (2022 BS Tokyo edition) (The Asset)
Westworld (Engerraund Serac)
Kim Yoon-seok
The Chaser (Eom Joong-ho)
The Yellow Sea (Myun Jung-hak)
The Priests (Father Kim)
The Fortress (Kim Sang-hun)
1987: When the Day Comes (Commissioner Park Cheo-won)
Dark Figure of Crime (Kim Hyung-min)
Benicio del Toro
Fear and Loathing in Las Vegas (2014 Blu-ray and DVD editions) (Dr. Gonzo)
Traffic (Javier Rodriguez)
Sin City (Detective Lieutenant Jack "Jackie Boy" Rafferty)
Things We Lost in the Fire (Jerry Sunborne)
The Wolfman (Lawrence Talbot/The Wolfman)
No Sudden Move (Ronald Russo)
Gary Oldman
Sin (Charlie Strom)
Batman Begins (2007 NTV edition) (Commissioner Gordon)
The Unborn (Rabbi Joseph Sendak)
Paranoia (Nicholas Wyatt)
Mank (Herman J. Mankiewicz)
Crisis (Dr. Tyrone Brower)
Kevin Bacon
Wild Things (Sergeant Ray Duquette)
Hollow Man (Sebastian Caine)
The Following (Ryan Hardy)
Cop Car (Sheriff Kretzer)
Patriots Day (Richard DesLauriers)
Nicolas Cage
World Trade Center (John McLoughlin)
The Frozen Ground (Jack Halcombe)
Mandy (Red)
Color Out of Space (Nathan Gardner)
Viggo Mortensen
A Perfect Murder (David Shaw)
A Walk on the Moon (Walker Jerome)
28 Days (Eddie Boone)
Hidalgo (Frank Hopkins)
10,000 BC (Tic'Tic (Cliff Curtis))
300: Rise of an Empire (Themistocles (Sullivan Stapleton))
3000 Miles to Graceland (Michael Zane (Kurt Russell))
54 (Steve Rubell (Mike Myers))
The Alamo (James Bowie (Jason Patric))
Alien Resurrection (Frank Elgyn (Michael Wincott))
All or Nothing (Phil (Timothy Spall))
Anchorman: The Legend of Ron Burgundy (Ron Burgundy (Will Ferrell))
Anna Magdalena (Yau Muk-yan (Aaron Kwok))
The Assignment (Lt. Cmdr. Annibal Ramirez / Carlos (Aidan Quinn))
Avengers: Infinity War (Johann Schmidt/Red Skull (Ross Marquand))
Avengers: Endgame (Johann Schmidt/Red Skull (Ross Marquand))
Bad Company (Roland Yates (John Slattery))
Bandidas (Tyler Jackson (Dwight Yoakam))
Basic (Tom Hardy (John Travolta))
Bedtime Stories (Kendall Duncan (Guy Pearce))
Behind Enemy Lines (Master Chief Tom O'Malley (David Keith))
Ben-Hur (2000 TV Tokyo edition) (Messala (Stephen Boyd))
The BFG (The BFG (Mark Rylance))
The Big Lebowski (VHS/DVD edition) (Jeffrey "The Dude" Lebowski (Jeff Bridges))
Big Trouble (Arthur Herk (Stanley Tucci))
Black Hawk Down (2004 TV Tokyo edition) (SFC Norm "Hoot" Gibson (Eric Bana))
Blade (2001 TV Tokyo edition) (Deacon Frost (Stephen Dorff))
The Boondock Saints II: All Saints Day (Connor McManus (Sean Patrick Flanery))
Captain America: The First Avenger (Johann Schmidt/Red Skull (Hugo Weaving))
Cats (Growltiger (Ray Winstone))
Cats & Dogs (Mister Tinkles (Sean Hayes))
Charlie's Angels: Full Throttle (Ray Carter (Robert Patrick))
The Chronicles of Narnia: The Voyage of the Dawn Treader (Lord Drinian (Gary Sweet))
Clash of the Titans (2012 TV Asahi edition) (Draco (Mads Mikkelsen))
Cold Creek Manor (Dale Massie (Stephen Dorff))
Collateral (Ray Fanning (Mark Ruffalo))
Collateral Damage (Peter Brandt (Elias Koteas))
College Road Trip (Chief James Porter (Martin Lawrence))
The Counterfeiters (Salomon Sorowitsch (Karl Markovics))
Courage Under Fire (Lieutenant Colonel Nathaniel Serling (Denzel Washington))
Crash (Detective Graham Waters (Don Cheadle))
The Dark Knight Rises (Bane (Tom Hardy))
Day of the Dead (2020 Blu-ray edition) (Captain Henry Rhodes (Joseph Pilato))
The Detonator (2009 TV Tokyo edition) (Michael Shepard (William Hope))
Desperado (1998 TV Asahi edition) (El Mariachi (Antonio Banderas))
Desperate Measures (Peter J. McCabe (Michael Keaton))
Dick (H. R. Haldeman (Dave Foley))
Doctor Who(Ninth Doctor (Christopher Eccleston)
Down with Love (Peter MacMannus (David Hyde Pierce))
Dr. Strangelove (Group Captain Lionel Mandrake, President Merkin Muffley, Dr. Strangelove (Peter Sellers))
Dreamcatcher (Owen Underhill (Tom Sizemore))
Dreamer (Benjamin "Ben" Crane (Kurt Russell))
Driven (2005 NTV edition) (Beau Brandenburg (Til Schweiger))
The Equalizer (Teddy (Marton Csokas))
Escape from L.A. (Snake Plissken (Kurt Russell))
The Evening Star (Jerry Bruckner (Bill Paxton))
Farewell My Concubine (Xiaodouzi (Leslie Cheung))
Fargo (Lorne Malvo (Billy Bob Thornton))
The Fatal Encounter (Gwang-baek (Cho Jae-hyun))
Felon (John Smith (Val Kilmer))
The Fighter (Dick "Dicky" Eklund (Christian Bale))
First Man (Deke Slayton (Kyle Chandler))
Fosse/Verdon (Bob Fosse (Sam Rockwell))
Galaxy Quest (Guy Fleegman (Sam Rockwell))
The General's Daughter (Colonel Kent (Timothy Hutton))
Genius (C. L. Franklin (Courtney B. Vance))
The Glimmer Man (1999 TV Asahi edition) (Detective Jim Campbell (Keenen Ivory Wayans))
Goal! (Glen Foy (Stephen Dillane))
Godzilla vs. Kong (Walter Simmons (Demián Bichir))
Hardwired (Virgil Kirkhill (Val Kilmer))
The Haunted Mansion (Master Edward Gracey (Nathaniel Parker))
Hawaii Five-0 (Danny "Danno" Williams (Scott Caan))
Heat (1998 TV Asahi edition) (Chris Shiherlis (Val Kilmer))
The Hitchhiker's Guide to the Galaxy (Zaphod Beeblebrox (Sam Rockwell))
The Hobbit: The Desolation of Smaug (Bard the Bowman (Luke Evans))
The Hobbit: The Battle of the Five Armies (Bard the Bowman (Luke Evans))
The Hunted (Paul Racine (Christopher Lambert))
I Come with the Rain (Hasford (Elias Koteas))
Infernal Affairs (Chan Wing-yan (Tony Leung Chiu-wai / Shawn Yue))
Infernal Affairs III (Chan Wing-yan (Tony Leung Chiu-wai))
Inside Man (Detective Keith Frazier (Denzel Washington))
The King's Man (Grigori Rasputin (Rhys Ifans))
Kung Fu Yoga (Rendall (Sonu Sood))
Lamb (Ingvar (Hilmir Snær Guðnason))
Larry Crowne (Dean Tainot (Bryan Cranston))
Lassie (Sam Carraclough (John Lynch))
The Last Shot (Joe Devine (Alec Baldwin))
Leatherface (Hal Hartman (Stephen Dorff))
Léon: The Professional (1996 TV Asahi edition) (Malky (Peter Appel))
Lifeforce (2005 TV Asahi edition) (Col. Colin Caine (Peter Firth))
Little Nicky (Adrian (Rhys Ifans))
Lonely Hearts (Elmer C. Robinson (John Travolta))
Mad Dogs (Milo (Billy Zane))
The Marksman (James "Jim" Hanson (Liam Neeson))
Mindhunters (Jake Harris (Val Kilmer))
Mission: Impossible III (Owen Davian (Philip Seymour Hoffman))
Moulin Rouge! (The Duke of Monroth (Richard Roxburgh))
My Life Without Me (Lee (Mark Ruffalo))
Nanny McPhee and the Big Bang (Phil Green (Rhys Ifans))
Never Die Alone (King David (DMX))
The Nevers (Inspector Frank Mundi (Ben Chaplin))
The Newton Boys (Jess Newton (Ethan Hawke))
A Nightmare on Elm Street (Freddy Krueger (Jackie Earle Haley))
Nine (Guido Contini (Daniel Day-Lewis))
Notting Hill (Spike (Rhys Ifans))
Only Murders in the Building (Sting)
Out of Reach (Faisal (Matt Schulze))
Out of Sight (Maurice Miller (Don Cheadle))
The People vs. Larry Flynt (Jimmy Flynt (Brett Harrelson))
Planet of the Apes (General Thade (Tim Roth))
Platoon (2003 TV Tokyo edition) (Sergeant Bob Barnes (Tom Berenger))
The Preacher's Wife (Dudley (Denzel Washington))
Project A Part II (Awesome Wolf (Yao Lin Chen))
The Punisher (Howard Saint (John Travolta))
The Raven (Edgar Allan Poe (John Cusack))
Ray (Ray Charles (Jamie Foxx))
Rémi sans famille (Vitalis (Daniel Auteuil))
The Royal Tenenbaums (Richie Tenenbaum (Luke Wilson))
Safe House (DI Oliver Vedder (Gary Cargill))
Salvador (Jesús Irurre (Leonardo Sbaraglia))
Saw II (Detective Eric Matthews (Donnie Wahlberg))
Scenes from a Marriage (Jonathan Levy (Oscar Isaac))
Shang-Chi and the Legend of the Ten Rings (Xu Wenwu (Tony Leung Chiu-wai))
Snow White and the Huntsman (Beith (Ian McShane))
Species (Dr. Stephen Arden (Alfred Molina))
Speed 2: Cruise Control (Officer Alex Shaw (Jason Patric))
Spy Kids: All the Time in the World (Danger D'Amo / Time Keeper, Tick Tock, Danger's Father, Time Keeper's Henchmen (Jeremy Piven))
Star Trek: The Motion Picture (Willard Decker (Stephen Collins))
Sucker Punch (The Wise Man / The General / The Bus Driver (Scott Glenn))
Surrogates (Thomas "Tom" Greer (Bruce Willis))
The Taking of Pelham 123 (Ryder / Dennis Ford (John Travolta))
The Taking of Tiger Mountain (Yang Zirong (Zhang Hanyu))
Talk to Her (Marco Zuluaga (Darío Grandinetti))
Thank You for Smoking (Nick Naylor (Aaron Eckhart))
Timeless (Garcia Flynn (Goran Višnjić))
Twilight (Reuben Escobar (Giancarlo Esposito))
Twister (Bill "The Extreme" Harding (Bill Paxton))
U.S. Marshals (Mark J. Sheridan / Mark Roberts / Mark Warren (Wesley Snipes))
Under the Tuscan Sun (Martini (Vincent Riotta))
Universal Soldier: Regeneration (Sergeant Andrew Scott (Dolph Lundgren))
Vicky Cristina Barcelona (Juan Antonio Gonzalo (Javier Bardem))
Village of the Damned (1998 TV Asahi edition) (Frank McGowan (Michael Paré))
A View to a Kill (2006 DVD edition) (Max Zorin (Christopher Walken))
Watchmen (Rorschach (Jackie Earle Haley))
Zombieland (Tallahassee (Woody Harrelson))
Zombieland: Double Tap (Albuquerque (Luke Wilson))

Animation
Bolt (Penny's manager)
Brave (King Fergus)
Brother Bear (Sitka)
Coraline (Charlie Jones)
DC League of Super-Pets (Lex Luthor)
Finding Nemo (Gill)
Finding Dory (Gill)
Guillermo del Toro's Pinocchio (Count Volpe)
Happy Feet Two (The Mighty Sven)
Madagascar: Escape 2 Africa (Makunga)
Monsters vs. Aliens (General W.R. Monger)
Rango (Roadkill)
Rio (Nico)
Rio 2 (Nico)
Rise of the Guardians (Pitch)
The Lego Batman Movie (Lord Voldemort)
Toy Story 3 (Chatter Telephone)
Vivo (Andrés)
Zootopia (Mr. Big)

Others
Machi Chūka de Yarouze (BS-TBS, 2019–present), narrator

Awards

See also
List of Japanese actors

References

External links
 Official agency profile 
 
 

1954 births
Living people
Japanese male film actors
Japanese male stage actors
Japanese male television actors
Japanese male video game actors
Japanese male voice actors
Japanese male musical theatre actors
Male voice actors from Mie Prefecture
20th-century Japanese male actors
21st-century Japanese male actors